Vzteklina (Rabies) is a Czech crime thriller television series broadcast on Czech Television in 2018. The series was filmed in 2017 in the village of Dolejší Těšov and directed by Tomáš Bařina.

Plot
Animals infected with rabies start toappear in the area around the Šumava village of Bučiny. Virologist Pavel Rogl is sent to the area with task to find the cause of the situation. He oversees vaccinations and is also tasked with writing an expert report on a double murder.

Cast
 Kryštof Hádek as virologist Pavel Rogl
 Johana Matoušková as Gabriela Burešová, daughter of the main suspect
 Gabriela Heclová as Táňa Burešová, younger daughter of the main suspect
 Igor Bareš as Václav Bureš, the main suspect
 Adéla Petřeková as Kateřina Roglová, journalist and Rogl's sister
 Petr Stach as MUDr. Tomáš Polota, ex-husband of Gabriela Burešová
 Jan Vlasák as MUDr. Oldřich Vacek, local doctor
 Leoš Noha as major Rudolf Valenta, policeman
 Filip Čapka as first lieutenant Luděk Cílek, policeman
 Pavla Beretová as first lieutenant Klára Pleslová, policewoman
 Eva Leinweberová as MUDr. Lenka Niklová, policejní patoložka
 Števo Capko as lieutentant Brož, policeman
 Jan Novotný as Alois Pudil

References

External links 
Official site
IMDB site

Czech crime television series
Czech thriller television series
2018 Czech television series debuts
Czech Television original programming